Vanished Empire is a 2008 Russian drama film directed by Karen Shakhnazarov.

Plot 
The film tells two guys studying at the same institute and in love with one girl. They do not even suspect that their country will soon fall apart.

Cast 
 Aleksandr Lyapin as Sergei Narbekov
 Lidiya Milyuzina as Lyuda Beletskaya
 Egor Baranovskiy as Stepan Molodtsov
 Ivan Kupreenko as Kostya Denisov
 Armen Dzhigarkhanyan as Sergei's grandfather
 Olga Tumaykina as Sergei's mother
 Vladimir Ilyin as Stepan 30 years later
 Tatyana Yakovenko as Lyuda's mother
 Yanina Kalganova as Katya
 Vasiliy Shakhnazarov as Misha (as Vasya Shakhnazarov)

Reception

Critical response
Vanished Empire has an approval rating of 75% on review aggregator website Rotten Tomatoes, based on 12 reviews, and an average rating of 5.90/10.

References

External links 
 

2008 films
2000s Russian-language films
Russian drama films
2008 drama films
Films directed by Karen Shakhnazarov